Robert Gossett (born March 3, 1954) is an American actor. Gossett is the first cousin of actor Louis Gossett Jr. and is best known for his role of Commander Russell Taylor on the TNT crime drama, The Closer and on its successor series Major Crimes.

Career
Gossett landed his first professional job after he graduated from high school in a production of One Flew Over the Cuckoo's Nest. He went on to act in the Broadway production of Lloyd Richard's Fences, Hal Scott's A Raisin in the Sun and Donald McKayle's The Last Minstrel Show. He also performed in the Negro Ensemble Company's productions of Manhattan Made Me, Sons & Fathers of Sons, A Soldier's Play and Colored People's Time. Robert also has extensive television experience with guest starring roles on Crossing Jordan, NYPD Blue, and Black Angel. In film, Gossett has acted in the Jeff Bridges/Tim Robbins film Arlington Road and the Sandra Bullock movie The Net.

On the October 18, 2021 episode of ABC's long-running daytime drama, General Hospital, Gossett made his debut as a mysterious man taking a special interest in former private eye and present club owner Curtis Ashford.  As Curtis was filling in his current love interest Portia Robinson of parts of his past, including the story of how his father "died" when he was very young, Gossett's character was lurking in the doorway of Curtis' club, simply watching Curtis. This character is subsequently revealed to be Curtis' long lost dad, Marshall Ashford, who suffers from schizophrenia.

Personal life
He is married to theater director Michele Gossett.

Filmography

Film

Television

Awards and nominations
NAACP Theater Award for Best Performance by a Male, Indigo Blues (1993)
Dramalogue Best Actor Award, Indigo Blues (1993)
LA Weekly Theater Award, Washington Square Moves (1995)
Dramalogue Best Actor Award, Washington Square Moves (1995)

References

External links

1954 births
American male stage actors
American male film actors
American male television actors
Living people
People from the Bronx
20th-century American male actors
21st-century American male actors